Edward Haycock Sr. (29 July 1790 – 20 December 1870) was an English architect working in the West Midlands and in central and southern Wales in the late Georgian and early Victorian periods.

Biography
Haycock was the grandson of William Haycock (1725–1802) of Shrewsbury and the son of John Hiram Haycock (1759–1830), who were architects and building contractors. Haycock joined the family business after 1810 and took control of it after his father's death in 1830. He stopped working as a building contractor around 1845 and was joined by his son Edward Haycock Junior (1829/30-1882), who continued the architectural practice until about 1880. He married Mary Hatton on 13 February 1827 at St Sepulchre-without-Newgate, London.  By her he had three sons and four daughters.

Haycock also played an active part in the political life of Shrewsbury as a Conservative: he sat on the council for thirty-four years, rose to become an alderman, and served as mayor in 1842. He was a friend of the Shrewsbury architect John Carline and also of Dr Robert Waring Darwin, the father of the naturalist Charles Darwin.

He died on 20 December 1870 at his home, The Priory, Shrewsbury, aged 80 and was buried in St Chad's churchyard.

"Haycock Way", linking Shrewsbury's 20th century inner ring road to the Column roundabout at Abbey Foregate, is named after the family.

Architectural career

Haycock received professional training in London under Sir Jeffrey Wyattville, exhibiting at the Royal Academy between 1808 and 1810. He then rejoined his father in the family building firm, working as builder and architect until about 1845, when he became a full-time architect. Work for the Gwynne family of Monachty led to the planning of Aberaeron. He was appointed County Surveyor of Shropshire from 1834 to 1866.

Associations and style
Haycock was a member of a group of architects which included Thomas Farnolls Pritchard, Joseph Bromfield and John Carline, who established Shrewsbury as a major centre for architectural innovation in the later 18th and first half of the 19th century. This group gained many major architectural commissions in Shropshire and over much of Wales, despite competition from major London architects. Edward Haycock Snr specialised as a Gothic Revival architect. His father had used the Ionic order very effectively on the ill-fated Shrewsbury Shirehall and Edward Haycock continued with the use of Ionic orders on his major projects as at Millichope Park, Glynllifon and Clytha Park. His churches tend to be more pedestrian, using a simplified Gothic, often with crocketed pinnacles on the towers. A departure from this is St Catherine's, Doddington, (a suburb of Whitchurch, Shropshire) 1836–7, which has an impressive Grecian revival facade.

Town of Aberaeron

Aberaeron was founded by the Rev. Alban Thomas Jones Gwynne following an Act of Parliament in 1807, but it appears that town did not start to be laid out until about 1830. Edward Haycock was employed by Colonel A J Gwynne for supervising the building of houses and their layout in a grid plan around squares, including the principal one, Alban Square. In 1833, Samuel Lewis's “Topographical Dictionary of Wales” records “Upwards of thirty new leases have been granted, pursuant to which several houses have been already built, and others are already in progress; a general post-office, a posting-house and an excellent hotel have been established". The Town Hall (1833–35), which later became the Cardiganshire County Hall, a typical building in Haycock's style, soon followed. The building of the planned town continued until the 1850s with a house in Portland Place being dated 1855. The posting house mentioned by Lewis could be the Castle and the hotel could be the Harbourmaster Hotel. Haycock achieved a consistency of style throughout the project which results in the attractive appearance of Aberaeron today.

List of architectural work

Public buildings and monuments

Shrewsbury 1814–16: Lord Hill's Column at Shrewsbury (assisted by Thomas Harrison of Chester
Shrewsbury, The Butter Market, Pride Hill, 1819–20, demolished 1830 – New Butter Market
Dolgellau, Merionethshire, The County Hall, 1823-5
Coed-Cwnwr Almshouses, Monmouthshire, 1825
Shire Hall, Presteigne 1826-9
Shrewsbury, The Salop Infirmary, rebuild 1827–30
Monmouth, Shire Hall extension, c. 1830
Old Town Hall, Ellesmere, 1833
Cardiff, The Market
Neath Market, 1835-6
Shrewsbury Savings Bank
Shrewsbury The Music Hall, 1839–40
Wrockwardine Almshouses 
Dowlais Market Hall
Llandovery National School
Llandeilo Bridge, 1848
Shrewsbury Lancastrian School
Shrewsbury St Chad's School, 1859
Shropshire County Lunatic Asylum alterations

A newspaper obituary states Haycock also "obtained first prizes for plans for the Birmingham and New Orleans Infirmaries" but these are not mentioned by Colvin.

Churches

Shropshire
Shrewsbury St George, Frankwell 1829–32
Tilstock 1835
Whitchurch, St Catherine, Doddington. 1836-7
Cruckton 1840 
Cressage 1841
Cound 1842-3 
Bayston Hill 1843
Clun Chapel Lawn 1843
Hope 1843
Middleton-in-Chirbury 1843
Dorrington 1843-5 
Newcastle 1848
Church Pulverbatch 1852-3 
Christ Church Shelton and Oxon 1854

Staffordshire
Tettenhall 1825

Breconshire
Hay on Wye 1833-4

Cardiganshire 
Aberaeron 1835

Carmarthenshire
Carmarthen St David.
Llannon 1841

Ceredigion 
Aberaeron
Aberystwyth St Michael 1830-3
St David's Church, Barmouth 1830

Glamorgan 
Caerphilly 1826
Tai Bach Margam 1827
Beulah Calvinistic Methodist Chapel, Groes, 1838

Merioneth
Barmouth 1830

Monmouthshire
Abersychan 1831-2 
Trevethin St Thomas 1831-2 
Lanvaud 1843

Montgomeryshire
Machynlleth 1827

Country houses

Shropshire 
Onslow Hall 1815–20  – Remodelled house for John Wingfield
Loton Park – Reconstructed south front 1819.
Hodnet Rectory. For Rev Reginald Heber. Presumably a joint design with his father.
Stanton Lacy Downton Hall near Ludlow. 1824  – New front entrance
Clungunford House.1825-8. For the Rev John Rocke. 
Orleton Hall. Refronted house c1830.
Walford Manor 1831–5.
Leaton Knolls. c1835. Demolished 1955. 
Millichope Park, Shropshire 1835–40, Greek Revival house for Rev. R. N. Pemberton.
Longner Hall. Alterations 1838–42.
Condover Vicarage 1843. Tudorish.
 Badger Hall. Alterations 1849–50.
Netley Hall, Shropshire.1854-8. 
Stanton Lacy Vicarage.

Herefordshire
Shobdon Court. Alterations c1830-5.
Shobdon Rectory. 1844.

Northamptonshire
Kelmarsh Hall. Minor alterations 1842.
Farthingstone Rectory. Enlarged 1842–3.

Caernarfonshire
Glynllifon 1836–49. For Lord Newborough.

Carmarthenshire
Stradey Castle 1849–53.

Cardiganshire
Llansantffraed Alltlwyd House 1832.
Plas Llangoedmor, Rebuilt 1833.
Monordeifi (Manordeifi), Clynfyw c1849-50 (now Pembrokeshire).
Llandygwydd Penlyan. 1852.

Ceredigion 
Nanteos Portico, new dining room and new frontage to stable block, c. 1839–49. The original stable block appear to have been built to designs by John Nash in c. 1813–15.

Glamorgan
Penrice Castle Minor Works.
Swansea Penllergare. 1836. Demolished except for a lodge and observatory.
Sketty Hall −1830s Entrance hall

Montgomeryshire
Welshpool Rectory
Churchstoke Vicarage. Enlarged 1846–7.

Monmouthshire
Clytha Park 1824–28 – House for William Jones

Neath Port Talbot
 Margam Castle 1830-1835 - Haycock worked as supervising architect, in support of Thomas Hopper

Radnorshire 
Stanage Park. Alterations 1845.

Gallery

Literature
Colvin H. (2008) A Biographical Dictionary of British Architects 1600–1840. Yale University Press, 4th edition London.
Lloyd T et al.(2006):Carmarthenshire and Ceredigion: The Buildings of Wales, Yale University Press.
J Newman and N Pevsner, (2006), The Buildings of England: Shropshire, Yale.
R Scourfield and R Haslam (2013, The Buildings of Wales: Powys; Montgomeryshire, Radnorshire and Breconshire, Yale University Press.

References

External links

 Edward Haycock entry at Oxford Art/Grove Art Online (Subscription paywall). Retrieved 9 January 2020

1790 births
1870 deaths
Mayors of places in Shropshire
Architects from Shrewsbury
19th-century English architects
Architecture in Wales